Leonid Koshelev (born 20 December 1979) is a Russian-Uzbekistani football midfielder. He currently plays for NBU Osiyo.

Career
He started playing in Navbahor Namangan in 1997, spending 4 seasons. In 2001 Koshelev moved to Pakhtakor Tashkent.
In February 2013 he moved from FK Dinamo Samarqand back to his former club Navbahor Namangan. In February 2014 he joined NBU Osiyo.

International
He made his debut in the national team on 11 July 1999 in friendly match against Malaysia in Samarkand. He played 43 matches for national team and scored 6 goals.

Honours

Navbahor Namangan
 Uzbek Cup (1): 1998
 Uzbek Supercup(1): 1999

Pakhtakor
 Uzbek League (5): 2002, 2003, 2004, 2005, 2007
 Uzbek Cup (4): 2001, 2002, 2003, 2004
 CIS Cup: 2007

Career statistics

National team

Goals for Senior National Team

References

External links
 
 
 

1979 births
Living people
Uzbekistani footballers
Uzbekistan international footballers
2004 AFC Asian Cup players
Pakhtakor Tashkent FK players
FC Shinnik Yaroslavl players
FC Shurtan Guzar players
FC Qizilqum Zarafshon players
Russian Premier League players
Uzbekistani expatriate footballers
Expatriate footballers in Russia
Uzbekistani expatriate sportspeople in Russia
FK Dinamo Samarqand players
Uzbekistani people of Russian descent
Association football midfielders